Kolář (feminine: Kolářová) is a Czech surname meaning "wheeler". Notable people include:

 Anna Kolářová (born 1997), Czech swimmer
 Běla Kolářová (1923–2010), Czech artist and photographer
 Daniel Kolář (born 1985), Czech footballer
 Daniela Kolářová (born 1946), Czech actress
 Jarek Kolář (born 1977), Czech videogame designer 
 Jiří Kolář (1914–2002), Czech poet, writer, painter and translator
 Karel Kolář (born 1955), Czech runner
 Luboš Kolář (born 1929), Czech basketball player
 Martin Kolář (born 1983), Czech footballer
 Oldřich Kolář (1898–unknown), Czech cross-country skier
 Ondřej Kolář (born 1994), Czech footballer
 Petr Kolář (born 1962), Czech politician
 Stanislav Kolář (1912–2003), Czech table tennis player
 Viktor Kolář (born 1941), Czech photographer
 Zdeněk Kolář (born 1996), Czech tennis player

See also
 
 
23648 Kolář, main-belt minor planet
 Kolár
 Kolar (surname)

Czech-language surnames
Occupational surnames